Harmonia is a genus of plants in the family Asteraceae. All 5 known species are endemic to the Coast Ranges of northern and central California. All but H. nutans grow on serpentine soils.

Harmonia is related to Madia, and both genera are commonly known as tarweeds. Harmonia is an annual shrub very often with bristles and sometimes with glandular hairs as well. Hears have a single series of phyllaries, subtending 3-8 fertile ray flowers plus 7-30 fertile yellow disc flowers.

 Species
 Harmonia doris-nilesiae (T.W.Nelson & J.P.Nelson) B.G.Baldwin Klamath Mts.
 Harmonia guggolziorum B.G.Baldwin - Mendocino Co, California
 Harmonia hallii (D.D.Keck) B.G.Baldwin	Coast Ranges of north-central California
 Harmonia nutans (Greene) B.G.Baldwin Coast Ranges near San Francisco Bay
 Harmonia stebbinsii (T.W.Nelson & J.P.Nelson) B.G.Baldwin Klamath Mts.

References 

Asteraceae genera
Endemic flora of California
Madieae
Flora without expected TNC conservation status